Sebaste was a common placename in classical Antiquity. Sebaste was the Greek equivalent (feminine) of the Latin Augusta. Ancient towns by the name sought to honor Augustus or a later Roman emperor.

Sebaste may refer to:

Places in Turkey
 Sivas, a city in Sivas Province
 as Sebastea or Sebaste di Armenia, a former Metropolitan archbishopric, now a Latin Catholic titular see
 Sebaste in Phrygia, town of ancient Phrygia, now in Turkey
 Elaiussa Sebaste, or Sebaste in Cilicia, near modern Ayas, in Mersin Province
 Cabira, later called Sebaste during Roman times
 Niksar, in modern Tokat Province, called Sebaste during Roman times
 Pompeiopolis, later called Sebaste during Roman times

Other places
 Sebastia, Nablus, or Sebaste in Palæstina, a village in the West Bank, known as Samaria before 30 BCE and Sebaste in Latin
 Sebaste, Antique, a municipality in the Philippines

See also 
 Sebasteia
 Sebastopolis (disambiguation)
 Sebastos (Augustus)